First Love and Other Sorrows is a collection of short stories by Harold Brodkey, first published in 1958. Eight of its nine stories were originally printed in The New Yorker and "Trio for Three Gentle Voices" in Mademoiselle. The compilation was the first book Brodkey published.

Stories
"The State of Grace"
"First Love and Other Sorrows"
"The Quarrel"
"Sentimental Education"
"Laurie Dressing"
"Laura"
"Trio for Three Gentle Voices"
"Piping Down the Valleys Wild"
"The Dark Woman of the Sonnets"

1958 short story collections
American short story collections
Dial Press books